In Norse mythology, Suttungr was a jötunn and the son of Gilling.

Mythology 
Suttungr searched for his parents and threatened the dwarven brothers Fjalar and Galar who had killed them, tying them and some other dwarves who killed Gilling to a rock that would be submerged by the rising tide. The dwarves begged for Suttungr to spare their life and offered him the magical mead of poetry. Suttungr took it and hid it in the center of the mountain Hnitbjorg, with his daughter Gunnlöð standing guard, whom he turned into a witch in order to guard it.

Odin eventually decided to obtain the mead. He worked for Baugi, Suttungr's brother, a farmer, for an entire summer, then asked for a small sip of the mead, which Suttungr refused. Baugi drilled into the mountain and Odin changed into a snake and slithered inside. Inside, Gunnlöð was on guard but he persuaded her to give him three sips in exchange for three nights of sex. Odin proceeded to drink all the mead in the three containers, changed into an eagle and escaped. Suttungr chased him in the shape of an eagle, but Odin was able to escape him and returned to Asgard. Gunnlöð later bore Odin a son, Bragi.

Notes

Jötnar